Spit at Me and Wreak Havoc on My Flesh is the debut full-length studio album of Gnaw Their Tongues, independently released in January 2006.

Track listing

Personnel
Adapted from the Spit at Me and Wreak Havoc on My Flesh liner notes.
 Maurice de Jong (as Mories) – vocals, effects, recording, cover art

Release history

References

External links 
 
 Spit at Me and Wreak Havoc on My Flesh at Bandcamp

2006 debut albums
Gnaw Their Tongues albums